

A
 Abdullah Ssekimwanyi
 Angelina Atyam
 Apolo Kivebulaya
 Aziz Azion
 Abigaba Cuthbert Mirembe
 Ali Fadhul

B
 Bazilio Olara-Okello
 Beatrice Wabudeya
 Benjamin Joseph Odoki
 Bettinah Tianah
 Betty Bigombe
 Bright Rwamirama   
 Busingye Kabumba

C
 Chameleone
 Charles Bakabulindi
 Charles Mbire
 Christine Kitumba
 Crispus Kiyonga
 Chris Baryomunsi

D
 Daudi Migereko
 David Oyite-Ojok
 David Wakinona

E

 Emmanuel Kakooza
 Emmanuel Amey Ojara
 Emmanuel Otala
 Emmy Okello
 Eriya Kategaya
 Ephraim Kamuntu
 Ezra Suruma
Edward A Bamucwanira

F
 Francis Butagira
 Fred Mukisa
 Fred Omach
 Fred Ruhindi

G
 Gabriel Opio
 Gagawala Wambuzi
 Galdino Moro Okello
 George Wilson Kanyeihamba
George K Turyasingura
 Geoffrey Oryema
 Gilbert Bukenya
 Godfrey Binaisa
 Godliver Businge

H
 Henry Bagiire
 Henry Morton Stanley
 Henry Mzili Mujunga
 Henry Oryem Okello
 Hilary Onek
 Hope Mwesigye

I
 Idi Amin Dada
 Irfan Afridi
 Isaac Musumba

J
 James Baba
 James Munange Ogoola
 James Wapakhabulo
 Janani Luwum
 Janet Museveni
 Jeje Odongo
 Jennifer Namuyangu
 Jessica Alupo
 Jessica Eriyo
 John Akii-Bua
 John Byabagambi
 John Nasasira
 John Ssebaana Kizito
 John Wilson Nattubu Tsekoko
 Joseph Kony
 Joseph Mulenga
 Joshua Cheptegei
 James R Tumusiime

K
 Kabalega
 Kamanda Bataringaya
 John-Mary Kauzya
 Ken Lukyamuzi
 Kiddu Makubuya
 Kizza Besigye
 Kakooza Richard

L
 Lilian Mary Nabulime

M
 Mahmood Mamdani
 Martin Stephen Egonda-Ntende
 Matia Kasaija
 Maria Mutagamba
 Matthew Lukwiya
 Michael Kawalya Kagwa
 Mildred Barya
 Milton Obote
 Miria Obote
 Moses Ndiema Kipsiro
 Muhammad Kibirige Mayanja
 Muljibhai Madhvani
 Musa Echweru
 Mustafa Adrisi
 Mutesa I of Buganda
 Mutesa II of Buganda
 Mwesigwa Rukutana

N
 Nabwana I.G.G.
 Norbert Mao
 Nsaba Buturo

O
 Odong Latek
 Okello Oculi
 Okot p'Bitek
 Olara Otunnu
 Omara Atubo
 Omwony Ojwok

P
 Patrick Etolu
 Paulo Muwanga
 Peter Lokeris
 Perez Ahabwe
 Perezi Kamunanwire
 Phiona Mutesi
 Phiona Okumu
 Pumla Kisosonkole
 Pyarali Merali
 Pallaso

Q
 Queen Best

R
 Raska Lukwiya
 Richard Nduhura
 Ruhakana Rugunda
 Rukia Isanga
 Rukia Chekamondo
 Kakooza Richard

S
 Salim Saleh
 Seezi Mbaguta
 Samuel Kutesa
 Serapio Rukundo
 Shimit Amin
 Simon D'Ujanga
 Simon Ejua
 Simon Lokodo
 Stephen Kiprotich
 Stephen Mallinga
 Sudhir Ruparelia
 Sulaiman Madada
 Syda Bbumba
 Ssekikubo Theodore
 Moses Swaibu – English footballer

T
 Tarsis Kabwegyere
 Tito Okello
 Tereza Mbire

U
 Usama Mukwaya

V
 Victoria Nalongo Namusisi

Y
 Yusuf Lule

See also
 Lists of people by nationality
 List of Governors of Uganda
 List of Ugandan first-class cricketers
 List of Governors-General of Uganda
 Ugandan university leaders
 List of Makerere University academics